Quillacollo Municipality is the first municipal section of the Quillacollo Province in the Cochabamba Department, Bolivia. Its capital is Quillacollo. At the time of census 2001 the municipality had 104,206 inhabitants.

Geography 
Other mountains are listed below:

Subdivision 
Quillacollo Municipality is divided into  cantons.

See also 
 Tunari National Park

References 

Municipalities of the Cochabamba Department